Anthony F. Gregorc is an American who has taught educational administration. He is best known for his disputed theory of a
Mind Styles Model and its associated
Style Delineator. The model tries to match education to particular learning styles, as identified by Gregorc.

Career
Gregorc obtained a B.S. degree from Miami University and an M.S. degree and a Ph.D. degree from Kent State University. He has taught mathematics and biology and has been principal of a laboratory school for gifted youth.  He was an associate professor of education administration at the University of Illinois at Urbana-Champaign and associate professor of curriculum and instruction at the University of Connecticut. He is president of Gregorc Associates, Inc., in Columbia, Connecticut.

Mind Styles Model and Gregorc Style Delineator

The Gregorc Style Delineator is a self-scoring written instrument
that elicits responses to a set of 40 specific
words.
Scoring the responses will give values for a model with two axes: a
"perceptual space duality," concrete vs. abstract, and
an "ordering duality," sequential vs.
random
The resulting quadrants are the "styles":

 Concrete Sequential
 Concrete Random
 Abstract Sequential
 Abstract Random

Descriptions of the characteristics of these styles can be found in the
materials available from Gregorc Associates.

A similarly structured (two-axis, four-style) learning style model
with rather different axes and interpretation can be seen in the
Kolb LSI.

Supporting evidence

The design, conduct, and results of Gregorc's original testing of the
validity of his instrument and model are presented in his
Development, Technical, and Administration Manual,
self-published and sold by Gregorc Associates. Some peer review has since
appeared in conventional channels:

With the exception of Joniak and Isakson (1988) and O'Brien (1990), the only
other psychometric analysis of the GSD has been limited to Gregorc's (1979)
initial assessments made during the instrument's early development in which
Gregorc interviewed several hundred participants. He compared the agreement of
GSD scores with an untested self-assessment scale to establish the instrument's
face validity for each individual (i.e., the instrument's results versus an
individual's subjective agreement that their learning style profile tends to
fit them). The correlations of the instrument's general results and the
subjectively rated agreement attributes were reported to be between .55 and
.76. This problematic method was adopted again in a subsequent comparative
analysis by the author (Gregorc, 1982c) and also yielded what Gregorc
considered positive results--29% strongly agreeing, 57% agreeing, 14% unsure,
and none
disagreeing.

Review of Gregorc's study

Timothy Sewall, in a comparison of four learning style assessments
(Gregorc's, Myers Briggs, Kolb LSI, and an LSI by
Canfield) by review of their published supporting studies (i.e., without
new experimental work) concluded of Gregorc's design, "the most appropriate
use of this instrument would be to provide an example of how not to
construct [an] assessment tool."

Studies by others

Reio and Wiswell (2006) report on their own independent study and
on those done earlier by O'Brien (1990) and Joniak and Isakson
(1988).

Reliability

Internal consistency or reliability concerns
whether evidence can show that an instrument is repeatably measuring something
(which may be, but is "not necessarily what it is supposed to be
measuring").

Gregorc (1982c) reported test-retest correlation coefficients of .85 to .88
(measured twice with intervals ranging from 6 hours to 8 weeks) and alpha
coefficients of .89 to .93 on all four scales. In this study, the
Cronbach's alpha coefficients on all scales or channels ranged from .54 to
.68 (CS = .64, CR = .68, AR = .58, AS = .54). This study's alpha coefficients
are consistent with those reported by O'Brien (1990) and Joniak and Isakson
(1988), which ranged from .51 to .64 and .23 to .66, respectively, on all
scales.

For internal consistency reliability estimates, although an alpha level of .70
can be considered "adequate," for the purposes of this study we considered a
stricter alpha level of .80 as a "good" cutoff value for our psychometric
examination of the GSD
(Henson, 2001).

Construct validity

Construct validity concerns
whether evidence can show that what the instrument is measuring is at all what
the offered theory claims it is (whether each construct in the model "adequately
represents what is intended by theoretical account of the construct being
measured").

The data disconfirmed
both the two- and four-factor confirmatory models. In the post hoc exploratory
factor analyses, many of the factor pattern/structure coefficients were
ambiguously associated with two or more of the four theoretical channels as
well. Overall, there was little support for the GSD's theoretical basis or
design and the concomitant accurate portrayal of one's cognitive learning
style.

[F]ar more work is needed on the GSD if indeed two bipolar
dimensions and Gregorc's mediational or channel theory are to be empirically
supported and if it is to be appropriately used with samples of
adults.

Consistent with Joniak and Isaksen (1988) and O'Brien (1990), the GSD did not
display sufficient empirical evidence to validate the instrument's scores or to
confirm Gregorc's theoretical interpretation of four learning style channels or
two bipolar
dimensions.

Supporting evidence, learning style models generally

A report from the UK think-tank Demos reported that
the evidence for a variety of learning style models is "highly variable",
that "authors are not by any means always frank about the evidence for their
work, and secondary sources ... may ignore the question of evidence altogether,
leaving the impression that there is no problem here."

Major works
 Gregorc Style Delineator - A psychometric test
 An Adult's Guide to Style, Gabriel Systems, Maynard (1982).
 Mind Styles FAQs Book
 The Mind Styles Model: Theory, Principles and Practice

See also
 Learning styles

Footnotes

References
 Anthony F. Gregorc. Gregorc Style Delineator: Development, Technical, and Administration Manual. Gregorc Associates, Inc., 1984.
 Timothy J. Sewall. "The measurement of learning style: a critique of four assessment tools". Technical report (ERIC ED267247), Wisconsin University, Green Bay, Assessment Center, 1986.
 

21st-century American psychologists
Living people
Educational psychologists
Intelligence researchers
Miami University alumni
Kent State University alumni
Year of birth missing (living people)